Kauaiina montgomeryi is a moth of the family Geometridae first described by Jules C. E. Riotte in 1978. It is endemic to the eastern part of the Hawaiian island of Maui.

References

Larentiinae
Endemic moths of Hawaii
Biota of Maui
Moths described in 1978